Oxelösund Municipality held a municipal election on 20 September 1998 as part of the local elections. This was held on the same day as the general election.

Results
The number of seats remained at 31 with the Social Democrats winning the most at 20, a gain of one from 1994, retaining their overall majority. There were 6,984 valid ballots cast.

Electoral wards
All electoral wards were located within the Oxelösund urban area in a single constituency. For a detailed map of the electoral wards, see the 2010 official results held within the same boundaries.

References

Oxelösund
Oxelösund municipal elections